Babaratma (also, Babaratly) is a village and municipality in the Shaki Rayon of Azerbaijan.  It has a population of 332.

References 

Populated places in Shaki District